Didžiasalis is a linear village in the Ignalina eldership, Lithuania. It is situated within the Sirvėta Regional Park. According to the 2011 census, it had 71 residents.

History 
Due to its archaic architecture, the village is an ethnocultural reserve, which includes 42 homesteads and 25 individually protected buildings. The village is situated along one street. Homesteads have irregular plans, some of which are located on both sides of the street. Houses are mostly double-ended; barns often have side barns; granaries have hip or half-hip roofs.

References 

Villages in Utena County
Ignalina District Municipality